Stefanos Kragiopoulos (born 31 January 1990) is a Greek footballer who plays for Pierikos in the Greek Football League 2 as a centre back. In the past he has played for Pierikos, Vataniakos and Iraklis.

Club career
Kragiopoulos started his career with Pierikos. He debuted for the club in an away win against Diagoras. On 30 August 2013 he transferred to Greek Football League club Iraklis. He debuted for Iraklis in the last match of the 2012–13 season, a home win against Niki Volou. On 6 August Kragiopoulos signed for Iraklis Ambelokipi.

References 

Living people
1990 births
Greek footballers
Iraklis Thessaloniki F.C. players
Pierikos F.C. players
Footballers from Katerini
Association football central defenders